Les Warren (22 September 1896 – 9 October 1972) was an Australian rules footballer who played with Fitzroy in the Victorian Football League (VFL).

Notes

External links 
		

1896 births
1972 deaths
Australian rules footballers from Victoria (Australia)
Fitzroy Football Club players